Sun Bank Halt in Wrexham County Borough, Wales, was a minor station on the Ruabon to Barmouth line. It opened as Garth & Sun Bank Halt but was renamed on 1 July 1906. The line was double track and there was never a signal box nor freight facilities here.

On 7 September 1945, the bank of the Shropshire Union Canal failed, causing the trackbed to be washed away near the halt. A mail and freight train was derailed, killing one person and injuring two people. A fire broke out, destroying all but the brake van of the train's consist.

Neighbouring stations

References

Further reading

External links
 Sun Bank Halt on navigable 1946 O.S. map

Disused railway stations in Wrexham County Borough
Railway stations in Great Britain opened in 1905
Railway stations in Great Britain closed in 1950
Former Great Western Railway stations